John Edward Jones (2 May 1806 – 25 July 1862) was a noted Irish civil engineer and sculptor, active in Dublin and London.

Biography
Jones was born in Dublin, the son of miniature painter Edward Jones. As 'J. Jones', architect, 7 Amiens Street, North Strand, Dublin, he exhibited several watercolors at the Royal Hibernian Academy in 1828 and 1829, including his View of the Town of Youghall, showing the proposed Chain Bridge (1828) and Design for a Viaduct (1829). He studied engineering under Alexander Nimmo, and for him worked on major engineering projects in Ireland including the building of the bridge at Waterford from 1829 to 1832 (which he directed). He was listed as a civil engineer in Wilson's Dublin Directory for the years 1833–35 with an office address at the Commercial Buildings, Dame Street. In 1839 he was awarded a Telford Medal in silver and 20 guineas for his paper and drawings on the sewage in Westminster.

In 1840 Jones ceased his engineering practice to become a sculptor in London, with considerable success, particularly in portrait busts of notables including Queen Victoria and Albert, Prince Consort. He exhibited at the Royal Academy from 1854 to 1862. Jones died while visiting Finglas, near Dublin, and is buried in Mount Jerome Cemetery.

References 

 Irish Architectural Archive
 W.G. Strickland, A Dictionary of Irish Artists, vol. I, 1913, pages 557–8.
 Joseph Dunn, P. J. Lennox, The Glories of Ireland, Kessinger Publishing, 2004, page 86. .
 Survey of London: volume 21: The parish of St Pancras part 3: Tottenham Court Road & neighbourhood (1949), pp. 13–26, Charlotte Street. (British History Online)
 Civil Engineer and Architect's Journal, vol. 2, London : Thomas Burrows, 1839, page 311.

Irish sculptors
1806 births
1862 deaths
Burials at Mount Jerome Cemetery and Crematorium
19th-century sculptors